Ilvar may refer to:
 Ilvar-e Yek Dangeh
 Ilvar-e Panj Dangeh